Monkeyland is a free roaming, multi-species primate sanctuary founded in 1998 by Tony Blignaut, which is located at The Crags near Plettenberg Bay in the Western Cape, South Africa. Monkeyland is one of four sanctuaries managed by The South African Animal Sanctuary Alliance (SAASA), the others being Birds of Eden and Jukani Wildlife Sanctuary in Plettenberg Bay, and Monkeyland's s sister sanctuary, MonkeylandKZN near Ballito on the Dolphin Coast.

Facilities
Primates move freely in the sanctuary and are able to enjoy a life as close to natural as possible for a captive held wild animal.

Animals
Monkeyland Primate Sanctuary opened its doors to the public on 6 April 1998. As of September 2022 the sanctuary accommodated over 550 primates of 9 different species that have previously been kept in cages or zoos, as pets, or in laboratories. All have subsequently been re-acclimated to a larger and free-living environment. 

Species housed at the sanctuary include:
 Ring Tailed Lemurs
 Black and White Ruffed Lemur
 Lar Gibbons
 Black Howler Monkey
 Spider Monkey
 Bolivian Squirrel Monkey
 Vervet Monkey 
 Red Backed Bearded Saki 
 Brown Tufted Capuchin Monkey

Awards
As a member of SAASA Monkeyland was honoured with four major tourism awards in 2014. The four awards are namely the Lilizela Tourism Visitor Experience of the Year Award at 'Wildlife Encounters', the Skål International Sustainable Tourism Award, Overall winner of the World Responsible Tourism Award as well as the Gold Award in World Responsible Tourism in the category of 'Best Animal Welfare Initiative'. In 2019 after opening Monkeyland KZN, SAASA was again awarded the Skål International Sustainable Tourism Award for Major Tourist Attraction.

Land ownership 
In 2021, Monkeyland instituted a campaign that will purchase the sanctuary's property in trust, effectively giving the primates right of ownership to the land.

References

External links 

Monkey parks
Tourist attractions in the Western Cape
Buildings and structures in the Western Cape